Polly Fordyce is an Associate Professor of Genetics and Bioengineering and fellow of the ChEM-H Institute at Stanford University. Her laboratory's research focuses on developing and applying new microfluidic platforms for quantitative, high-throughput biophysics and biochemistry and single-cell genomics.

Fordyce was born and raised in Washington, DC.

Education
Fordyce double-majored in physics and biology at the University of Colorado Boulder, graduating in 2000. She then began a PhD in the lab of Steven Block at Stanford University, where she worked as part of a team that developed new microscopes for applying force to molecules and understanding how it affected their movements. After receiving her PhD in 2007, she moved to UCSF to pursue postdoctoral research in Joe DeRisi's laboratory developing high-throughput methods for the analysis of transcription factor interactions. She has been a professor at Stanford since 2014.

Research
Fordyce's lab develops approaches for high throughput quantitative biochemistry, biophysics, and single cell assays, using a variety of approaches including microfluidics. One of her lab's accomplishments is the development of the method HT-MEK (High-Throughput Microfluidic Enzyme Kinetics), which enables researchers to analyze the effects of thousands of mutations on an enzyme's activity in a single experiment.

Awards

 Graduate Research Fellow, National Science Foundation (2002–2005)
 G. J. Lieberman Fellow, Stanford University (2003–2004)
 Helen Hay Whitney Postdoctoral Fellowship, Helen Hay Whitney Foundation (2008–2011)
 Pathway to Independence Award (K99), NIH (2012–2014)
 Scialog Fellow, Gordon and Betty Moore Foundation (2016–2017)
 New Innovator Award (DP2), NIH (2016–2021)
 Alfred P. Sloan Foundation Research Fellow, Alfred P. Sloan Foundation (2017–2019)
 Investigator, Chan Zuckerberg Biohub (2017–2022)
 Breakthrough Science Initiative Award, Ono Pharma Foundation (2019–2022)
 NSF CAREER Award (2022).
 Eli Lilly Award in Biological Chemistry (2023)

References

External links 

Year of birth missing (living people)
Living people
Women geneticists
Stanford University faculty
University of Colorado Boulder alumni
Stanford University alumni